Flight leader Lieutenant Henry Adams "Black Bart" Bartholomay (March 20, 1945 – October 5, 2015) was a United States Naval Aviator. He was a recipient of the Silver Star and the Distinguished Flying Cross.

Biography
He was born in Chicago, Illinois. He died in Vero Beach, Florida.

He entered the Naval Reserve in 1967 and began active duty in the Naval Aviation Officer's program in Pensacola, Florida. After receiving his Wings of Gold in 1969 at Kingsville, Texas, LTJG Bartholomay was assigned to the replacement F-4 Phantom Air Wing in San Diego, California and then to Fighter Squadron 161, Carrier Air Group 5 aboard USS Midway. After one tour of duty in Viet Nam, LT Bartholomay was assigned as Weapons Training Officer and completed advanced fighter weapons and air combat maneuvering training at TOPGUN in February, 1972 where he achieved the status of "Top Gun".

During his second tour of duty on board USS Midway in Vietnam, LT Bartholomay, his Radar Intercept Officer Oran Brown, his wingman LT Pat Arwood, and his RIO LT Mike "Taco" Bell, confronted and shot down two North Vietnamese MiG-19 enemy aircraft on May 18, 1972 for which they were awarded the Silver Star.

Completing his Naval Reserve duty in December 1972, LT Bartholomay had accumulated 267 carrier landings, 1200 flight hours, and was awarded the Silver Star, Distinguished Flying Cross, 10 Strike Flight Air Medals.  After leaving the Navy, he went on to work as a weapons system engineer at Point Mugu, CA, consulting on the Sidewinder Missile.  At the end of that consulting contract, he returned to the Chicago area and worked in the insurance, investment, and technology industries.

References

 Bart Bartholomay 1972 NFWS "Top Gun" class photo.}
. { Henry "Bart" Bartholomay obituary]

1945 births
2015 deaths
Businesspeople from Chicago
Military personnel from Illinois
Aviators from Illinois
Recipients of the Silver Star
United States Naval Aviators
Recipients of the Distinguished Flying Cross (United States)
20th-century American businesspeople